This is a list of bridges and other crossings of the Merrimack River from its mouth in the Gulf of Maine at Newburyport, Massachusetts, upstream to its source at the merger of two rivers in Franklin, New Hampshire. Some pedestrian bridges and abandoned bridges are also listed.

Crossings

An italicized entry in the "name" column means that the real name is missing.

References

External links

Bridges in Massachusetts
Bridges in New Hampshire
Bridge crossings
Merrimack River